Bulbophyllum dearei (Deare's bulbophyllum) is a species of orchid.

dearei